The bantamweight boxing competition at the 1980 Olympic Games in Moscow was held from 20 July to 2 August at the Olympiysky Sports Complex. 33 boxers from 33 nations competed.

Schedule

Results

Finals

Round of 64

Top half

Bottom half

References

Boxing at the 1980 Summer Olympics